Cornell Orlando Armstrong (born September 22, 1995) is an American football cornerback for the Atlanta Falcons of the National Football League (NFL). He played college football at Southern Miss.

Early years
Armstrong attended Bassfield High School in Bassfield, Mississippi.

College career
Armstrong played college football at Southern Miss.

Professional career

Miami Dolphins
Armstrong was drafted by the Miami Dolphins in the sixth round (209th overall) of the 2018 NFL Draft. He was released during final roster cuts on August 31, 2019.

Houston Texans
On September 1, 2019, Armstrong signed a two-year contract with the Houston Texans. He was waived on September 10, 2019 and re-signed to the practice squad. He was promoted to the active roster on October 26, 2019. Armstrong signed a contract extension with the Texans on March 1, 2021. He was waived/injured on August 30, 2021 and placed on injured reserve. He was released on September 7, 2021.

Atlanta Falcons
On December 7, 2021, Armstrong was signed to the Atlanta Falcons practice squad. He signed a reserve/future contract with the Falcons on January 10, 2022. He was placed on injured reserve on August 16, 2022. He was released on August 24. He was re-signed to the practice squad on October 3, 2022. He was promoted to the active roster on October 29. On March 18, 2023, Armstrong re-signed with the Falcons on a one-year deal.

References

External links
 Atlanta Falcons bio

1995 births
Living people
People from Jefferson Davis County, Mississippi
Players of American football from Mississippi
American football cornerbacks
Southern Miss Golden Eagles football players
Miami Dolphins players
Houston Texans players
Atlanta Falcons players